UFC 168: Weidman vs. Silva 2 was a mixed martial arts event held on December 28, 2013, at the MGM Grand Garden Arena in Las Vegas, Nevada.

Background
The event was headlined by a UFC Middleweight Championship rematch between current champion Chris Weidman and former champion Anderson Silva. The two previously met at UFC 162, with Weidman winning via KO in the second round and earning the title.

Co-featured was a UFC Women's Bantamweight Championship bout between current champion Ronda Rousey and Miesha Tate.  The two met before under the Strikeforce banner in 2012 with Rousey winning via first round submission. This served as the coaches bout for The Ultimate Fighter 18.

Initially, it was announced that Rousey would face top contender Cat Zingano at this event, after Zingano defeated Tate at The Ultimate Fighter 17 Finale.  However, Zingano was pulled from the bout, and subsequently as coach for The Ultimate Fighter, after it was announced that she had suffered a knee injury and would be sidelined for several months.  Tate was tabbed as the replacement and the rematch with Rousey was announced.

Shane del Rosario was expected to face Guto Inocente at the event, but both men pulled out of the bout, citing injuries. On November 26, 2013, del Rosario had two sudden heart attacks and died on December 9, 2013.

Diego Brandão weighed in seven pounds over the featherweight limit of 146 lb. Brandão re-weighed and was 151.5, but was still fined 25% of his purse for missing weight.

Results

Bonus awards
The following fighters were awarded $75,000 bonuses.

 Fight of The Night: Ronda Rousey vs. Miesha Tate
 Knockout of The Night: Travis Browne
 Submission of the Night: Ronda Rousey

Reported payout
The following is the reported payout to the fighters as reported to the Nevada State Athletic Commission. It does not include sponsor money and also does not include the UFC's traditional "fight night" bonuses.
 Chris Weidman: $500,000 (includes $200,000 win bonus) def. Anderson Silva: $600,000
 Ronda Rousey: $100,000 (includes $50,000 win bonus) def. Miesha Tate: $28,000
 Travis Browne: $56,000 (includes $28,000 win bonus) def. Josh Barnett: $170,000
 Jim Miller: $92,000 (includes $46,000 win bonus) def. Fabricio Camoes: $8,000
 Dustin Poirier: $46,000 (includes $23,000 win bonus) def. Diego Brandao: $20,000^
 Uriah Hall: $20,000 (includes $10,000 win bonus) def. Chris Leben: $51,000
 Michael Johnson: $36,000 (includes $18,000 win bonus) def. Gleison Tibau: $39,000
 Dennis Siver: $66,000 (includes $33,000 win bonus) def. Manvel Gamburyan: $25,000
 John Howard: $32,000 (includes $16,000 win bonus) def. Siyar Bahadurzada: $17,000
 William Macario: $20,000 (includes $10,000 win bonus) def. Bobby Voelker: $12,000
 Robert Peralta: $24,000 (includes $12,000 win bonus) def. Estevan Payan: $10,000

^ Although not recognized on the official pay sheet, Brandao was fined 25% of his base pay ($5,000) for missing weight for the fight, half of that money went to NSAC and half to Poirier.

See also
List of UFC events
2013 in UFC
Miesha Tate vs. Ronda Rousey

References

Ultimate Fighting Championship events
2013 in mixed martial arts
Mixed martial arts in Las Vegas
2013 in sports in Nevada
MGM Grand Garden Arena